Christopher Brymer (born November 29, 1974) is a retired American football guard.

Early life and college
Born in Apple Valley, California, Brymer graduated from Apple Valley High School in 1993 and attended University of Southern California until 1997. He redshirted his freshman season and was academically ineligible to play in 1995. At USC, Brymer was an offensive lineman.

Career
He played in the summer of 1999 for the Rhein Fire of the NFL Europe then was an off-season member of the Dallas Cowboys in the 1999 NFL season. In 2001, he played for the Los Angeles Xtreme of the XFL, a league that would fold after its only season. He moved to San Juan Capistrano, California afterwards and founded mortgage loan company CMG Capital.

Personal life
Brymer was married to his high school girlfriend Melissa; they had a son in 2003 and separated in 2005. Melissa Brymer told SF Weekly in 2010 that Chris, during his football career, would have angry bouts and accuse her of infidelity. After CMG Capital folded, the Brymers lost their two homes. Melissa moved to San Bernardino County with their son, and Chris became homeless.

On July 19, 2010, Brymer left a San Francisco soup kitchen with another man, Henry Therkield, who had accosted him earlier. Brymer pulled out a 6-inch blade and became confrontational with that man and that man's friend Shaun Parker before leaving on a MUNI T-line train. Brymer was arrested the next day at another MUNI station. During the trial, Therkield testified that he heard Brymer threaten him but stated otherwise in an interview with SF Weekly.  However, Brymer was acquitted of hate crimes in November 2010. Former San Francisco district attorney Terence Hallinan commented about acquittals like this: "Juries lose confidence in [prosecutors], and a hate crime doesn’t have the same clarity that it should have."

References

1974 births
Living people
American football offensive guards
Dallas Cowboys players
Homeless people
Los Angeles Xtreme players
Sportspeople from San Bernardino County, California
Players of American football from California
Rhein Fire players
USC Trojans football players
People from Apple Valley, California